is a passenger railway station  located in the city of Kawanishi, Hyōgo Prefecture, Japan. It is operated by the private transportation company Nose Electric Railway.

Lines

Station layout
The station two opposed ground-level side platforms, connected by an underground passage. The station is unattended.

Platforms

Adjacent stations

History
Tsuzumigataki Station opened on April 13, 1913. It was relocated to its present location on May 25, 1969.

Passenger statistics
In fiscal 2019, the station was used by an average of 5413 passengers daily

Surrounding area
Aeon Town Kawanishi

See also
List of railway stations in Japan

References

External links 

 Tsuzumigataki Station official home page 

Railway stations in Hyōgo Prefecture
Stations of Nose Electric Railway
Railway stations in Japan opened in 1913
Kawanishi, Hyōgo